The Royal Society Milner Award, formally the Royal Society Milner Award and Lecture, is awarded annually by the Royal Society, a London-based learned society, for "outstanding achievement in computer science by a European researcher". The award is supported by Microsoft Research and is named in honour of Robin Milner, a prolific pioneer in computer science who, among other contributions, designed LCF and the programming language ML.

Recipients should be active researchers in computer science who are either European or have resided in Europe for at least 12 months prior to their nomination. Winners receive a bronze medal and a personal prize of £5,000 and are invited to deliver a public lecture on their research at the Society. The Council of the Royal Society chooses recipients on the recommendation of the Milner Award Committee. The Committee is made up of Fellows of the Royal Society, Members of the Académie des sciences (France), and Members of Leopoldina (Germany).

Preceding the Milner Award was the Royal Society and Académie des sciences Microsoft Award, which rewarded scientists in Europe for advancements in science using computational methods. It lasted from 2006 to 2009 until it was replaced by the current award. The ACM SIGPLAN Robin Milner Young Researcher Award is a similar award rewarded for "outstanding contributions by young investigators in the area of programming languages".

Recipients
The inaugural winner Gordon Plotkin received his prize in 2012 but delivered his public lecture in 2013, the same year as Serge Abiteboul. In 2018, Marta Kwiatkowska became the first female recipient of the award. Although the 2019 recipient Eugene Myers is American, he moved to Dresden, Germany, in 2012 to become a director of the Max Planck Institute of Molecular Cell Biology and Genetics, thus meeting the criteria for a researcher who is European or has lived in Europe for at least 12 months. Due to infection control measures taken because of the COVID-19 pandemic, the 2020 lecture was held as a Zoom webinar.

See also 
 List of computer science awards

References

External links

Awards of the Royal Society
Computer science awards